Paliganj is a city in Patna district, Bihar, India. It is one of the 6 sub-division (Tehsil) of Patna District in Patna district.

Administration
The Paliganj sub-division (Tehsil) is headed by an IAS or state Civil service officer of the rank of Sub Divisional Magistrate (SDM).

Blocks
The Paliganj Tehsil is divided into 3 Blocks, each headed by a Block Development Officer (BDO). List of Blocks is as follows:
 Paliganj 
 Dulhin Bazar
 Bikram

Politics

Paliganj is part of the Paliganj Assembly constituency under the Pataliputra Lok Sabha constituency. Sandeep Saurav is the current MLA who defeated Jay Vardhan Yadav in 2020 Bihar Assembly Election.

Notable people
 Ram Lakhan Singh Yadav
 Jai Vardhan Yadav

Education
  Ram Lakhan Singh Yadav College Paliganj
Vishwanath High School, Chandhos

List of villages
The list of villages in Paliganj Block (under Paliganj Tehsil) is as follows:

 Akbarpur Ranipur
 Azada Sikariya
 Bhelariasai Rampur
 Chandos 
 Chikasi
 Dahiya
 Dharhara
 Jamharu Imam Ganj
 Jarakha
 Kalyanpur Paipura
 Kataka Paigamber Pur
 Khanpur Taranpur
 Lalganj Sahera
 Madhama Makhmilpur
 Mahabali Pur Chok
 Mashora Jalpura 
 Mauri Perpura
 Mera Patauna
 Murika
 Nadahari Kodahari
 Nirakhpur Pali
 Rampur Nagawa
 Ranipur Kurkuri
 Sarji Pipardaha
 Sigodi
Beldarichak

References

Patna district
Cities and towns in Patna district
Neighbourhoods in Patna